Johanna Dohnal (14 February 1939 - 20 February 2010) was an Austrian politician and the first Austrian Minister for Women.

Personal life

Dohnal was born in Vienna on 14 February 1939 to a single mother.

On 22 January 2010 she entered into a civil partnership with her long-standing partner Annemarie Aufreiter.

She died on 20 February 2010, at her home in Grabern, Lower Austria and is commemorated in a grave of honor in Vienna Central Cemetery.

Recognition 

Johanna Dohnal Platz in Vienna 6 was named in her honour in 2012.

Selected publications

References

Further reading

External links
 (posthumous)

1939 births
2010 deaths
Women government ministers of Austria
Government ministers of Austria
Austrian LGBT politicians
Politicians from Vienna
Austrian people of Czech descent
20th-century Austrian women politicians
20th-century Austrian politicians
Burials at the Vienna Central Cemetery